Andrea Romano (born December 3, 1955) is an American former casting director, voice director, and voice actress whose work includes Batman: The Animated Series, Ben 10: Ultimate Alien, Tiny Toon Adventures, Animaniacs, Bonkers, Freakazoid, Pinky and the Brain, Teen Titans, Avatar: The Last Airbender, The Legend of Korra, The Boondocks,  Static Shock, Justice League, Justice League Unlimited, Batman Beyond, Teenage Mutant Ninja Turtles (2012 TV series), SpongeBob SquarePants and multiple Warner Bros. Animation/DC Comics direct-to-video films including: Wonder Woman and Green Lantern: First Flight. Her voice acting, as of 2010, consists of minor roles in television series, direct-to-video films, and video games.

Early life
She was born in 1955. Romano grew up in Long Island, New York. Her father is Italian descent and her mother is of Austrian Jewish and Swedish descent. She pursued undergraduate education at State University of New York at Fredonia, graduating in 1977, before attending Rutgers University. She dropped out before finishing. At this time, she began auditioning for plays in Manhattan. While keeping a steady job during the day, Romano would perform in plays at night, often auditioning on her lunch break.

Early career
In 1979, Romano moved to San Diego, where it was difficult for her to find theater work. After working in a couple of plays, she was offered a temporary position at Abrams-Rubaloff, a talent agency in Los Angeles. Within months, due to the temporary position lasting longer than expected, Romano was franchised as an agent.

After leaving Abrams-Rubaloff, Romano joined Special Artists, a smaller agency, and began their voice-over department. While at Special Artists, she would also direct the potential client auditions. It was during her time at Special Artists that Romano began attending some of her clients' recording sessions at Hanna–Barbera. After a short time at Special Artists, she was asked to audition at Hanna–Barbera for the position of casting director.

Hanna-Barbera
Romano joined Hanna-Barbera in 1984. While at Hanna-Barbera, a position which she served for more than five years, Romano worked on such programs as The Smurfs, The New Adventures of Jonny Quest, Pound Puppies, and the 1985 revival of The Jetsons, among others. On all of which, she worked alongside director Gordon Hunt. She also worked on Jetsons: The Movie, though she had her name removed from the credits when an executive decision resulted in Janet Waldo's already-recorded work being discarded in favor of Tiffany. Near the end of recording for Jetsons: The Movie, Romano witnessed George O'Hanlon, who voiced George Jetson, die as the result of a stroke, in the recording studio. His wife was at his side.

Romano was approached by Disney, which was developing DuckTales at the time, to audition for the position of voice director of the series. Disney was auditioning five directors that would each direct one episode, after which, they would choose a director to direct the remaining episodes. One director did the first episode, then Romano directed the second episode; it was at this time that Disney chose to stop the audition process and have Romano direct the remaining episodes. Romano directed 61 episodes of DuckTales. While serving as voice director of DuckTales, for Disney, Romano remained on staff at Hanna-Barbera, as casting director until some of the Hanna-Barbera executives chose to leave and form a new company. Knowing she would not be able to direct in this new company, Romano chose to become a freelance director.

Freelance directing

1989–2000

Romano became a freelance casting and voice director in 1989. The first series she worked for, which was made for Warner Brothers, was Tiny Toon Adventures in 1990. That was followed by Batman: The Animated Series and The Plucky Duck Show in 1992; Animaniacs in 1993; Pinky and the Brain, The Sylvester & Tweety Mysteries and Freakazoid in 1995; Superman: The Animated Series and Road Rovers in 1996; The New Batman Adventures in 1997; Histeria! and Pinky, Elmyra & the Brain in 1998; and Batman Beyond in 1999; all for Warner Bros. She was also a voice director briefly for Bonkers in 1994. At the same time, Romano directed the first season of the first ever all-CGI series, ReBoot, however the position was taken over by Michael Donovan for the remainder of the show.

In addition to series, Romano also voice directed many direct-to-video films, including: Tiny Toon Adventures: How I Spent My Vacation, The Land Before Time II, The Land Before Time III, The Land Before Time IV, The Land Before Time V, and Wakko's Wish.

Since 2000
Since 2000, Romano has served as casting, and voice director for series, including; Justice League, Teen Titans, Avatar: The Last Airbender, The Batman, SpongeBob SquarePants, Ben 10: Alien Force, and Batman: The Brave and the Bold.

She has also done the DC Comics direct-to-video films, including: Superman: Doomsday, Justice League: The New Frontier, Batman: Gotham Knight, Wonder Woman, Green Lantern: First Flight, Justice League: Crisis on Two Earths, Batman: Under the Red Hood, and Batman: Year One.

Video games
On video games, Romano has stated, "On video games I only do special ones because video games tend to become recording 150 different 'oofs,' 20 different strangulation sounds... they aren't challenging to me and they are taxing on an actor's voice." Romano did her first voice direction of a video game on 1999's Descent 3. She later worked on Animaniacs Splat Ball, in 1999; Floigan Bros. and Batman: Vengeance, in 2001; Teen Titans, in 2005; Diablo III, in 2008; and Batman: The Brave and the Bold – The Videogame and StarCraft II: Wings of Liberty, in 2010.

Voice acting
Romano's first credited voice role was in a 1992 episode of Tiny Toon Adventures. Later, she again voiced herself on a 1996 episode of Animaniacs. She has also voice-acted for the series Justice League and Teen Titans. In addition to these, Romano also played voice-roles for some of her direct-to-video films: Batman Beyond: Return of the Joker, Batman: Mystery of the Batwoman, Batman: Gotham Knight, Superman/Batman: Public Enemies, Justice League: Crisis on Two Earths, and Superman/Batman: Apocalypse. She also voiced the Batcomputer in the 2010 video game, Batman: The Brave and the Bold – The Videogame.

Casting process and reputation
Romano is "renowned for considering 250-300 actors for lead roles", according to UGO. She dislikes having to replace actors, which is why she values actors who are not celebrities, having commented, "Replacing a celebrity ... that's really uncomfortable." Romano has joked that fans can sometimes tell what she has been watching on television or in the movies by whom she casts. She sometimes intentionally casts the same actors with whom she has worked previously, "because it was fun, it was good and I know they can do the job." Romano is known for having recording sessions with the actors recording lines in one room, rather than recording the actors' lines individually. She has been known for casting more famous names alongside veteran voice actors, most notably casting Mark Hamill (Luke Skywalker in Star Wars) as The Joker in Batman: The Animated Series (giving Hamill a new career as a voice actor), and regularly casts other famous guests on her shows, including Neil Patrick Harris, Weird Al Yankovic, William H. Macy, Paul Reubens, Shaquille O'Neal, James Hong, Dakota Fanning and Bernadette Peters on various shows, as well as Senator Patrick Leahy (a lifelong Batman fan) on Batman: The Animated Series, among other famous guests.

Her reputation includes Wired's Ken Denmead's description of Romano as an "iconic voice director". UGO refers to her as "arguably the best known casting/dialogue director on the animation scene today."

Wil Wheaton, an actor and voice actor whom Romano has worked with, has said: "I owe Andrea my whole animation career", after she cast him in The Zeta Project and Teen Titans.

Retirement and post-career plans 
Late in 2016, Romano announced that she would retire at the age of 65, which she reached in December 2020, and move to Brazil with her husband, who is from that country. She told The Dot and Line that she was training another woman to succeed her as voice director for the Warner Bros. Animation stable of actors, but would not identify her successor until she considered the person ready.

Filmography

Crew work

Voice work

References

External links

 

1955 births
Living people
American casting directors
Women casting directors
American voice directors
American voice actresses
Jewish American actresses
Place of birth missing (living people)
Daytime Emmy Award winners
Hanna-Barbera people
Walt Disney Animation Studios people
Warner Bros. Animation people
State University of New York at Fredonia alumni
Rutgers University alumni